Small GTPAses is a peer-reviewed scientific journal covering research on small GTPases, including their structural biology, biochemical regulation, and their individual and collective cell biological functions. The journal was established in 2010 and is published by Taylor & Francis. The editor-in-chief is Michael F Olson (Ryerson University). The journal is abstracted and indexed in MEDLINE/PubMed, Embase, and Scopus.

References

External links 
 

Biochemistry journals
Bimonthly journals
Taylor & Francis academic journals
Publications established in 2010
English-language journals